Oldřich Tikal (born 28 November 1938) is a Czech rower who represented Czechoslovakia. He competed at the 1960 Summer Olympics in Rome with the men's coxed four where they were eliminated in the semi-finals.

References

1938 births
Living people
Czechoslovak male rowers
Olympic rowers of Czechoslovakia
Rowers at the 1960 Summer Olympics
Rowers from Prague
European Rowing Championships medalists